Ain't Love Grand may refer to:

Ain't Love Grand!, a 1985 album by X
"Ain't Love Grand" (song), a 2002 song by Atreyu